Brittney Powell (born March 4, 1972) is a German-American actress. She has starred in Safety Geeks: SVI and has represented the show at Comic-Con in San Diego, California during 2009 and modeled for the Safety Geeks' 2010, 2011, and 2012 Safety Pin-Up Calendars.

Career

In 1991, Powell started her career in Playboy: Girls of Spring Break as herself. She then went on to be a contestant on Round Trip to Heaven. Powell has guest starred in more than 25 different TV series such as Friends, Harry and the Hendersons, California Dreams, The Commish, Silk Stalkings, Tarzan: The Epic Adventures, The Sentinel, NCIS, Invention with Brian Forbes, and Safety Geeks: SVI.

She has starred in more than ten films, including Airborne, Trouble Is My Business,.

Powell has starred in the short-lived Pacific Palisades in 1997. She was cast as Summer Halloway on General Hospital in 2002 where she had a contract role.

Powell modeled for the Safety Geeks' 2010, 2011, and 2012 Safety Pin-Up Calendars.

Filmography

n.b. for credit listings reference

Television

References

External links

 
 
 
 Brittney Powell at TV.com

1972 births
Living people
German film actresses
German television actresses
German female models
German emigrants to the United States
Web series actresses